Fatteh ( meaning crushed or crumbs, also romanized as fette, fetté, fatta or fattah) is an Egyptian and Levantine dish consisting of pieces of fresh, toasted, grilled, or stale flatbread covered with other ingredients that vary according to region. It is also some times referred to as Shâmiyât ( "Damascene") in the Levant area.

Geographical distribution
The fetté is known to be a very peculiar and ancient dish of the Egyptian and Southern Levant area, an area that comprises Damascus, Beirut, Jordan, Palestine and Israel, while being mostly unknown and unheard of in the Northern Levant.

Regional variations

Fetté dishes include a wide variety of regional and local variations, some of which also have their own distinct names.

 Egypt: Egyptians prepare a dish called "fatta" as a feast meal. It is prepared on special occasions, such as to celebrate a woman's first pregnancy or for an Iftar during Ramadan. It is made with a garlic and vinegar flavored meat soup and crispy flatbread served in a bowl with rice and a sauce consisting of garlic tomato sauce.
Levant: The Levantine "Fetté", eaten in breakfasts as well as in the evenings, always starts with a stack of khubz bread, topped by strained yogurt, steamed chickpeas and olive oil that are crushed and mixed together. In the next step, a teaspoon of cumin is almost always poured into the mixture. After that, virtually anything can be added to the bowl. Some fettés are made of eggplants and julienned carrots topped with grilled chicken and pine nuts while some contain lamb shanks, different spices and yogurt. The fattoush is a salad made with toasted pieces of pita bread that technically also falls into the family of "shâmiyât".
 Palestine: "Fetté Gazzewié" from Gaza, is served as plain rice cooked in meat or chicken broth and then flavored with mild spices, particularly cinnamon. The rice is then laid over a thin markook bread which is in turn smothered in clarified butter and topped with various meats. Musakhan is also a fetté dish.

See also

 Arab cuisine
 Middle Eastern cuisine
 List of African dishes

References

Bibliography

 
 
 

Arab cuisine
Levantine cuisine
Lebanese cuisine
Syrian cuisine
Egyptian cuisine
Jordanian cuisine
Palestinian cuisine
Ancient dishes